This is a list of religious centers in Tehran, Iran.

Shrines and imamzadehs

 Shah Abdol-Azim Shrine, Imamzadeh Hamzeh (fa) and Reza Shah's Mausoleum (demolished) – Rey
 Bibi Shahr Banu Shrine – Rey
 Imamzadeh Abdollah shrine and cemetery – Rey
 Imamzadeh Yahya (fa) – Owdelajan
 Imamzadeh Seyed Nasreddin (fa) – Khayyam St.
 Imamzadeh Seyed Esmail (fa) – Tehran Grand Bazaar
 Imamzadeh Zeid (fa) – Tehran Grand Bazaar
 Imamzadeh Seyed Vali (fa) – Tehran Grand Bazaar
 Imamzadeh Seyed Eshaq (fa) – Naser Khosrow St.
 Imamzadeh Qassem (fa) – Tajrish
 Imam Zadeh Saleh – Tajrish
 Imamzadeh Esmail – Zargandeh (fa)
 Imamzadeh Esmail (fa) – Chizar (fa)
 Imamzadeh Ali-Akbar (fa) – Chizar
 Imamzadeh Hassan (fa) – Qazvin Rd.
 Imamzadeh Masoum (fa) – Qazvin Rd.
 Imamzadeh Qazi al-Saber (fa) – Vanak
 Imamzadeh Mohammad-Vali (fa) – Darakeh
 Imamzadeh Saleh (fa) – Farahzad
 Imamzadeh Panj-Tan (fa) – Lavizan
 Imamzadeh Esmail (fa) – Lavasan
 Imamzadeh Hadi – Rey
 Imamzadeh Abolhassan (fa) – Rey
 Imamzadeh Bibi Zobeideh (fa) – Rey
 Imamzadeh Zeid (fa) – Vasafnard
 Imamzadeh Davood – Imamzadeh Davood

Mosques and madrasehs

 Old Jame Mosque – Tehran Grand Bazaar – 1662 (1072 AH)
 Mohammadieh Madraseh (fa) – Tehran Grand Bazaar – 18th century
 Haj Rajab-Ali Mosque (fa) – Buzarjomehri St. – 1800 (1215 AH)
 Shah Mosque – Tehran Grand Bazaar – 1810–1825 (1225–1240 AH)
 Khan-e Marvi Madraseh (fa) – Marvi St. – 1816 (1231 AH)
 Haj Seyed Azizollah Mosque (fa) – Tehran Grand Bazaar – Early 19th century
 Malek Mosque – Tehran Grand Bazaar – Early 19th century
 Aqa Mahmoud Mosque (fa) – Marvi St. – 1828 (1243 AH)
 Beinol-Haramein Mosque – Tehran Grand Bazaar – 1835 (1251 AH)
 Chalanchi Khan Mosque – Tehran Grand Bazaar – 1837 (1253 AH)
 Kharaqaniha Mosque – Rey St. – Mid-19th century
 Sanee od-Dowleh Mosque – Tehran Grand Bazaar – Mid-19th century
 Memarbashi Mosque and Madraseh (fa) – Emamzadeh Yahya – Mid-19th century
 Sheikh Abdolhussein Mosque and Madraseh (fa) – Pachenar  – 1854 (1270 AH)
 Old Sepahsalar Mosque and Madraseh (fa) – Marvi St. – 1861 (1277 AH)
 Abdollah Khan Madraseh – Tehran Grand Bazaar – 1861 (1277 AH)
 Asefieh Madraseh – Tehran Grand Bazaar – 1861 (1277 AH)
 Aqa Mosque – Buzarjomehri St. – 1863 (1280 AH)
 Moayyer ol-Mamalek Mosque and Madraseh (fa) – Khayyam Ave. – 1867 (1284 AH)
 Haj Qanbar-Ali Khan Mosque and Madraseh (fa) – Cyrus Ave. – 1871 (1288 AH)
 Khazen ol-Molk Mosque and Madraseh (fa) – Tehran Grand Bazaar – 1876 (1293 AH)
 Pamenar/Agha Bahram Mosque (fa) – Pamenar St. (fa) – 19th century
 Amin od-Dowleh Mosque – Tehran Grand Bazaar – 19th century
 Aqsa Mosque and Madraseh – Mowlavi Ave. – 19th century
 Aqa Jalal Mosque – Rey St. – 19th century
 Haj Seif od-Dowleh – Zahir-ul-Eslam St. – 19th century
 Dabbaghkhaneh Mosque – Buzarjomehri St. – 19th century
 Saheb-Jam Mosque – Saheb-Jam St. – 19th century
 Majd od-Dowleh Mosque (fa) – Sepah St. – 19th century
 Niaki Mosque – Pamenar St. – 19th century
 Haft-Tan Mosque – Tehran Grand Bazaar – 19th century
 Haft-Dokhtaran Mosque – Tehran Grand Bazaar – 19th century
 Chaharsuq Bozorg Mosque – Tehran Grand Bazaar – 19th century
 Chaharsuq Kuchak Mosque – Tehran Grand Bazaar – 19th century
 Nezam od-Dowleh Mosque (fa) – Naser Khosrow St. – 19th century
 Mirza Mousa Mosque (fa) – Tehran Grand Bazaar – 19th century
 Philsuf od-Dowleh Madraseh (fa) – Tehran Grand Bazaar – 19th century
 Dangi Madraseh – Pamenar St. – 19th century
 New Sepahsalar Mosque and Madraseh – Baharestan Sq. – 1879–1892 (1296–1309 AH)
 Kazemieh Madraseh – Emamzadeh Yahya – 1881 (1298 AH)
 Saheb-Divan Mosque – Tehran Grand Bazaar – 1885 (1302 AH)
 Seraj ol-Mulk Mosque – Amir-Kabir Ave. – 1886 (1303 AH)
 Saneeieh Madraseh – Emamzadeh Yahya – 1886 (1303 AH)
 Haj Abolfath Mosque and Madraseh – Rey St. – 1888–1894 (1305–1312 AH)
 Behbahani Mosque – Buzarjomehri St. – 1893 (1311 AH)
 Haj Esmail Mosque – Shah Sq. – 1896 (1314 AH)
 Moezz od-Dowleh Mosque (fa) – Iran St. – 1899 (1317 AH)
 Moshir os-Saltaneh Mosque and Madraseh (fa) – Mowlavi Ave. – 1900 (1318 AH)
 Hemmatabad Mosque – Sepah Ave. – 1906 (1324 AH)
 Qandi Mosque (fa) – Khaniabad – 1908 (1327 AH)
 Sanee-Divan Mosque – Shahpur Ave. – 1915 (1333 AH)
 Hedayat Mosque – Istanbul Ave. – Early 20th century
 Haj Saqabashi Mosque – Iran St. – Early 20th century
 Monirieh Mosque – Qazvin Ave. – Early 20th century
 Salman Mosque (fa) – Shahbaz Ave. – Early 20th century
 Firouzabadi Mosque (fa) – Rey – Early 20th century
 Lorzadeh Mosque – 1940s
 Fakhr od-Dowleh Mosque – Fakhrabad – 1945
 Sajjad Mosque (fa) – Fakhr-e Razi St. – 1947
 Arg Mosque (ru) – Arg Square – 1949
 Qoba Mosque – Old Shemiran Rd. – 20th century
 Abouzar Mosque (fa) – Fallah – 20th century
 Mojtahedi Madraseh (fa) – Tehran Grand Bazaar – 1956
 Tehran University Mosque (fa) – Tehran University – 1966
 Al-Javad Mosque – 20th century
 Khomeini Madraseh (fa) – Ozgol – 2003
 Grand Mosalla of Tehran

Hosseiniehs and tekyeh

 Tekyeh Dowlat – Golestan Palace (demolished)
 Tajrish Tekyeh (fa) – Tajrish
 Aqa Seyed Hashem (fa) – Naderi Ave.
 Dezashib Hosseineh (fa) – Dezashib (fa)
 Niavaran Tekyeh (fa) – Niavaran
 Nafarabad Tekyeh (fa) – Rey
 Hosseineh Ershad – Old Shemiran Rd.
 Jamaran Hosseinieh – Jamaran

Fire temples

 Fire Temple of Bahram – Rey – before Islam
 Adorian (fa) – Qavam St. – 1907
 Markar Complex – TehranPars – 1930s
 Shah Vrahram Izad – South Karegar St.
 Kushk-e Varjavand (fa) – Karaj Rd.
 Great Adorian – Vanak – Under Construction
 Tower of Silence (Dakhmeh-ye Gabrha) (fa) – Located on Moshirieh Rd. (fa) behind 7th unit of Tehran Cement Plant. It is circular in shape.
 Qasr-e-Firuzeh (fa) Zoroastrian Cemetery – 1935

Baha'i house of worship

 Hazirat ol-Qods (changed to a cultural center) (fa) – Hafez Ave.
 Proposed House of Worship

Churches

Orthodox churches

Armenian Apostolic
 St. Sarkis Cathedral (Սուրբ Սարգիս մայր տաճար) and Prelacy – KarimKhan Blvd. (fa) – 1970
 Saint George Church (Սուրբ Գևորգ եկեղեցի) (hy) – Shahpur Ave. (fa) – 1795
 Sts. Thaddeus-Bartholomew Church (Սուրբ Թադևոս-Բարդուղիմեոս եկեղեցի) – Tehran Grand Bazaar – 1768
 Saint Minas Church (Սուրբ Մինաս եկեղեցի) (hy) – Vanak – 1854
 Holy Mary Church (Սուրբ Աստվածածին եկեղեցի) – Qavam St. (fa) – 1945
 Holy Translators Church (Սուրբ Թարգմանչաց եկեղեցի) (hy) – Vahidieh – 1868
 Saint Gregory the Illuminator Church (Սուրբ Գրիգոր Լուսավորիչ եկեղեցի) (hy) – Majidieh (fa) – 1982
 Saint Vardan Church (Սրբոց Վարդանանց եկեղեցի) – Heshmatieh – 1986
 Saint John Chapel (Սուրբ Յովհաննէս մատուռ) – Doulab Armenian Cemetery – 1936
 Saint Stephen Chapel (Սուրբ Ստեփանոս մատուռ) (hy) – Nor Burastan Armenian Cemetery – 1974
 Holy Cross Chapel (Սուրբ Խաչ մատուռ) – Ararat Stadium – 1987

Assyrian Church of the East
 Saint George Church (Mar Gevargiz) – Bagh-e-Shah (fa) – 1962
 Holy Mary Church (Mart Maryam) – Sarbaz St. – 1978

Orthodox expatriate community churches

 Holy Mary Greek Orthodox Church – Roosevelt St. – 1941
 St. Nicholas Russian Orthodox Church – Roosevelt St. – 1945
 Russian Orthodox Chapel – Doulab Russian Cemetery

Catholic churches

Armenian Catholic

 Saint Gregory the Illuminator Church (Սուրբ Գրիգոր Լուսաւորիչ եկեղեցի) – Ghazali St. – 1954
 Saint Joseph Church (Սուրբ Յովսէփ եկեղեցի) – Mirdamad Blvd. – 1963
 Holy Mary Church (Սուրբ Աստվածածին եկեղեցի) – Yusefabad
 Armenian Catholic Chapel – Doulab Armenian Catholic Cemetery – 1946

Chaldean Catholic
 Saint Joseph Cathedral (Mar Yozef) – Forsat St. – 1950
 Holy Virgin Church – Appadana St.
 Chaldean Catholic Chapel – Eslamshahr Catholic Cemetery – 1967

Roman Catholic
 Holy Heart of Christ Roman Catholic Church – Old Shemiran Road (fa) – 1920
 Roman Catholic Cathedral of the Consolata – France St. (fa) – 1937
 St. Joan of Arc Roman Catholic Church (Lazarists) – Manouchehri St. – 1945
 Saint Abraham's Church (Dominican) – Jamalzadeh St. (fa) – 1966

Protestant churches

Evangelical Church
 St. Peter Evangelical Church (American) (fa) – Qavam St. (fa) – 1873
 Emmanuel Protestant Church – Tavanir St. – 1972
 Saint John (Սուրբ Յովհաննէս եկեղեցի) Armenian Protestant Church – Nader Shah Ave. – 1964
 St. Thomas (Mar Toma) Assyrian Evangelical Church (fa) – Amirabad – 1967
 Christuskirche (Christ Church) German Evangelical Church – Yakhchal St. – 1963

Anglican
 St. Paul Anglican Church (fa) – Hafez St. (fa) – 1967

Assemblies of God
 Assemblies of God Church – Takht-e-Jamshid Ave. (fa) – 1971

Evangelical Brotherhood
 Armenian Evangelical Brotherhood Church – Aban St. – 1970
 Assyrian Brotherhood Church – ShahrAra St.

Seventh-Day Adventist
 Seventh-Day Adventist Church – Rasht St. – 1955

Synagogues

 AbdullahZadeh Synagogue
 Abrishami Synagogue – Kakh St. (fa) – 1965
 AzizKhan Synagogue – Hafez Ave. (fa) – 1920s
 Bagh-e Saba Synagogue (fa) – Bagh-e Saba (fa) – 1951
 Daniel (Polish) Synagogue – Qavam St. (fa) – 1960
 Darvazeh Dowlat Synagogue – Darvazeh Dowlat (fa)
 Ettefagh Synagogue (Iraqi) – Shahreza Ave. – 1947
 Ettehad Synagogue – Jaleh St. (fa)
 Ezra Yaghoub Synagogue – Cyrus Ave. – 19th century
 Gorgan Synagogue – Gorgan St.
 Fakhrabad Synagogue – Fakhrabad
 Haim Synagogue – Qavam St. – 1913
 Hakim Asher Synagogue – Cyrus Ave. – 19th century
 Harambam Synagogue
 Khorasaniha Synagogue – Zartosht St. – 1975
 Kohan Synagogue
 Kurosh Synagogue
 Levian Synagogue
 Ma'ariv Synagogue
 Molla Hanina Synagogue – Cyrus Ave. – 19th century
 Nosrat Synagogue
 Pesian Synagogue (fa) – Zaferanieh – 1970
 Pol-e-Choobi Synagogue – Pol-e Choobi (fa)
 RafeeNia Synagogue
 Rah-e Danesh Synagogue – Yusefabad – 1966
 Gisha Synagogue – Gisha
 Tafian (Hakim) Synagogue
 Yusefabad Synagogue (Suket Shalim) – Yusefabad – 1966
 Zargarian Synagogue – Amirabad

Gurdwaras
 Tehran Sikh gurdwara – Baharestan Sq.

Other religious centers

 Ebn-e Babveyh Mausoleum and cemetery and Tughril Bey's Mausoleum – Rey
 Javan-Mard Qassab Mausoleum – mausoleum of a pre-Islamic semi-mythical hero – Rey
 Seyedeh Malek Khatoun Mausoleum – Khavaran Rd.
 Pir-e Ata Mausoleum (fa) – Pamenar
 Sar-e Qabr-e Aqa Mausoleum (fa) – Mowlavi St.
 Sheikh Abdollah Tarashti Mausoleum (fa) – Tarasht
 Sheikh Hadi Najmabadi Mausoleum (fa) – Naderi Ave.
 Dozens of Saqa Khanehs (fa): traditional places of prayer.
 Behesht-e Zahra cemetery and Mausoleum of Ruhollah Khomeini
 Safi-Ali Shahi khanqah (fa) – Baharestan Sq. – 1877–98 (1294–1316 AH)
 Nematollahi (Amir-Soleimani) Hosseinieh and khanqah – Sangelaj – 1863 (1280 AH)
 Zahir-ud-Dowleh khanqah and cemetery – Tajrish – 1924, where many Iranian giants of art and culture such as Iraj Mirza, Mohammad Taghi Bahar, Forough Farrokhzad, Abolhasan Saba, Ruhollah Khaleghi, and Darvish Khan are buried.
 Tehran War Cemetery – Qolhak, British Embassy Garden, where numerous World War II western Allied soldiers are buried.
 Polish Cemetery (Catholic Cemetery) – Doulab
 Doulab Cemetery with the Russian Unknown Soldier's Tomb (Cenotaph) is located here with a red star over it.
 Naghareh Khaneh Tower (fa) – Rey

See also
 List of Armenian churches in Iran
 List of synagogues in Iran
 List of cemeteries in Iran
 Religion in Iran

References

Religion in Tehran
 
Religious
Tehran